The 1945 Bucknell Bison football team was an American football team that represented Bucknell University as an independent during the 1945 college football season. In its second and final season under head coach J. Ellwood Ludwig, the team compiled a 2–5 record. Harold Stefl and Robert Williams were the team captains.

The team played its home games at Memorial Stadium in Lewisburg, Pennsylvania.

Schedule

References

Bucknell
Bucknell Bison football seasons
Bucknell Bison football